Meridemis validana is a species of moth of the family Tortricidae. It is found in Vietnam.

The wingspan is 13 mm for males and 19 mm for females. The forewings of the males are whitish, slightly mixed with cream along the costa and with brownish basally and dorsally. The hindwings are creamish, but greyish in the anal area and with subapical grey dots. The forewings of the females are greyish or cream white, the dorsum suffused with brownish and with brownish or grey spots or strigulae (fine streaks). The hindwings are cream, slightly mixed with ochreous and dotted with brownish at the apex.

Etymology
The species name refers to female genitalia and is derived from Latin validana (meaning strong).

References

Moths described in 2008
Archipini